Agave amica, formerly Polianthes tuberosa, the tuberose, is a perennial plant in the family Asparagaceae, subfamily Agavoideae, extracts of which are used as a note in perfumery. Now widely grown as an ornamental plant, the species was originally native to Mexico.

Etymology
The common name derives from the Latin tuberosa through French tubéreuse, meaning swollen or tuberous in reference to its root system.

Description 
The tuberose is herbaceous, growing from underground tubers or tuberous roots. It produces offsets. They are slightly succulent. There are six stamens, inserted into the tube of the flower, and a three-part stigma.

The double-flowered cultivar 'The Pearl' has broader and darker leaves, and shorter flower spikes, usually reaching only . Orange-flowered forms of the species have been reported. As well due to crossing with other species there are now yellow, pink, red and greenish forms.

Taxonomy
The species was first described for science by Carl Linnaeus in 1753, as Polianthes tuberosa. In 1790, Friedrich Kasimir Medikus moved the species to the genus Tuberosa as Tuberosa amica. Both morphological and molecular phylogenetic studies have shown that Polianthes is embedded within the larger genus Agave, and the genus is now included in a broadly circumscribed Agave. Two incorrect attempts were made to name the species when transferred to Agave. In 1999, Joachim Thiede and Urs Eggli published the name "Agave tuberosa". However, Philip Miller had published this name in 1768, for the species now called Furcraea tuberosa, so it cannot be used again, and Thiede and Eggli's name is illegitimate. In 2001, Thiede and Eggli published a replacement name (nomen novum), "Agave polianthes". However, since Medikus's Tuberosa amica is considered to be a synonym of Polianthes tuberosa, its epithet is the second oldest and according to the International Code of Nomenclature for algae, fungi, and plants should be used when the older epithet is unavailable. Hence Thiede and Eggli's second name is superfluous, and the correct name for the species within Agave is Agave amica, as was explained by Thiede and Rafaël Govaerts when they published this combination in 2017.

Distribution
The tuberose is believed to be native to central and southern Mexico. It is no longer found in the wild, probably as a result of being domesticated by the Aztecs. It is currently grown in many tropical and temperate countries.

Uses

In perfumery
The overwhelming fragrance of the tuberose has been distilled for use in perfumery since the 17th century, when the flower was first transported to Europe. French Queen Marie Antoinette used a perfume called Sillage de la Reine, also called Parfum de Trianon, containing tuberose, orange blossom, sandalwood, jasmine, iris and cedar. It remains a popular floral note for perfumes, either in stand-alone Tuberose fragrances or mixed floral scents, but it generally must be used in moderation because the essence is overpowering and can become sickly to the wearer.

Others
In India and Bangladesh they are widely used in making flower garlands which are offered to the gods or used as wedding ornaments.

While once associated with funerals, it is now used in floral arrangements for other occasions.

In Indonesia, tuberose flowers are also used in cooking.

In Hawaii, they are one of the main flowers used in the construction of leis. Some others are plumerias,  ginger, orchids, and pikake (jasmine).

Cultivation 

Tuberoses can be overwintered outdoors in hardiness zones 8-10. In colder zones, tuberoses are grown as summer annuals, in pots or mixed-flower borders where they can be enjoyed for their scent. To flower the plants require around 4 months of warm temperatures from the time the rhizome is planted. Gardeners usually start the rhizomes in pots in greenhouses beginning in late-winter or early spring, moving them outdoors in late spring once frost danger has passed. If they are started directly in the ground at this time, they may not bloom until September, greatly reducing the period in which their blooms may be enjoyed. Once the foliage begins to yellow in October, the leaves should be clipped, the rhizomes dug and stored in a cool, dry and dark place for the winter.

The more common variety is called 'Mexican Single', which, although not as decorative as 'The Pearl', makes for a longer lasting cut flower.

Tuberoses were especially beloved by Louis XIV of France, who had them planted in the hundreds in the flower beds of the Grand Trianon at Versailles so that the scent was overpowering, which no doubt helped cover the smells from the poor sanitation of the palace. They were grown in clay pots and planted directly in the ground; to keep the perfume consistently strong new specimens were rotated in, sometimes daily.

Gallery

References

External links

Night-blooming plants
amica
Endemic flora of Mexico
Plants described in 1753
Taxa named by Carl Linnaeus
Perfume ingredients